Montérolier is a commune in the Seine-Maritime department in the Normandy region in northern France.

Geography
The river Varenne has its source here. Montérolier-Buchy station has rail connections to Rouen, Lille and Amiens.

Surrounded by the communes Neufbosc, Mathonville and Saint-Martin-Osmonville, Montérolier is located 26 km northeast of Mont-Saint-Aignan, the largest city nearby.

History
During 1943, in the Clairefeuille woods at Montérolier, the Germans built underground galleries in which to store V-1 flying bombs. After the Second World War, the galleries were opened to the public. On the 21 and 22 June 1995, 13 people died accidentally in the tunnels.

Population

Places of interest
 The church of Notre-Dame, dating from the eighteenth century.
 Traces of an 11th-century castle.
 A nineteenth-century château.
 A sandstone cross, from the sixteenth century.
 The tunnels of Montérolier. (Closed since the accident in 1995).

People
 Jean de Grouchy, sieur of Montérolier (1354–1435).

See also
Communes of the Seine-Maritime department

References

External links

Montérolier - The tunnels of Clairefeuille 

Communes of Seine-Maritime